Ronald Raborg (born 6 November 1957) is a Peruvian former athlete. He competed in the men's long jump at the 1980 Summer Olympics.

References

External links
 

1957 births
Living people
Athletes (track and field) at the 1980 Summer Olympics
Peruvian male long jumpers
Olympic athletes of Peru
Place of birth missing (living people)
South American Games bronze medalists for Peru
South American Games medalists in athletics
Competitors at the 1978 Southern Cross Games
20th-century Peruvian people